Lycée Jacques Prevert is a high school in Miragoâne, Nippes, Haiti founded in 1950. It is a government project school.

References

Educational institutions established in 1950
Schools in Haiti
Nippes
1950 establishments in Haiti